Jan Philipsz. van Bouckhorst (1588 – 1631), was a Dutch Golden Age painter.

Biography
He was born in Haarlem, where he was trained by his father Philips Jansz. van Bouckhorst. He became 'vinder' in 1628, and in 1630 and 1631 deacon of the Haarlem Guild of St. Luke. He was a stained glass artist and landscape painter and became the teacher of Pieter Jansz (1612-1672).
He died in Haarlem.

References

Jan Philipsz. van Bouckhorst on Artnet

1588 births
1631 deaths
Dutch Golden Age painters
Dutch male painters
Dutch landscape painters
Artists from Haarlem
Painters from Antwerp